Jamaican dancehall and reggae artist Beenie Man has released eighteen studio albums, seven compilation albums and eighteen singles.

Albums

Studio albums

Compilations

Riddim Album Compilation features 
Beenie Man throughout his music career has featured on at least 800 riddim/rhythm productions from various reggae and dancehall producers worldwide dating back to the early 1990s to present date.

Collaboration albums
 1994: Guns Out (versus Bounty Killer)
 1994: 3 Against War (with Dennis Brown & Triston Palma)

Live albums
 1983: Aces International @ 82 Chisholm Avenue, Kingston
 2004: Live in San Francisco

Mixtapes and unofficial releases

 2000: Trendsetter
 2004: Cool Cool Rider - The Roots of a Dancehall Don
 2006: Its Ah! Beenie (riddim mixtape)

Singles

As lead artist

As featured artist

 1996: "Sound Clash" (Dream Warriors featuring Beenie Man)
 1996: "Hands In the Air" (Doug E. Fresh featuring Beenie Man)
 1999: "Outa Space (UFOs)" (Machel Montano featuring Beenie Man); album Any Minute Now
 2000: "Money" (Jamelia featuring Beenie Man)
 2001: "I'm Serious" (T.I. featuring Beenie Man)
 2004: "Compton" (Guerilla Black featuring Beenie Man)
 2005: "Soul on Fire" (KMC featuring Beenie Man)
 2006: "Belly Danza"  (Don Omar featuring Beenie Man)
 2006: "Zingy" (Ak'Sent featuring Beenie Man)
 2006: "Flow Natural" (Tito El Bambino featuring Deevani and Beenie Man)
 2006: "Heaven Baby" (Brooke Hogan featuring Beenie Man)
 2007: "Back It Up"
 2008: "Better than Dem" (Natasja featuring Beenie Man)
 2008: "Scorpion"  (Nisha B. featuring Beenie Man) 
 2008: "Burnin' Burnin"  (Ms. Triniti featuring Beenie Man)
 2009: "Get It On" (Rasun featuring Beenie Man) 
 2009: "Giggle" (Busta Rhymes featuring Beenie Man)
 2009: "Woman"
 2009: "International" (Chali 2na featuring Beenie Man)
 2009: "Pleasure" (2G featuring Beenie Man and Chris S)
 2012: "Gun Shot" (Nicki Minaj featuring Beenie Man)
 2013: "Boom Boom DanZe" (Annie Khalid featuring Beenie Man)
 2013: "Send It Up" (Kanye West featuring King Louie and Beenie Man)
 2014: "Dancehall Soldier (Yellow Claw featuring Beenie Man)
 2015: "Gimme That Love" (Zhavea featuring Beenie Man)
 2015: "Broken Heartbeat" (Teddybears featuring Beenie Man)
 2015: "Bitch Better Have My Money" (Rihanna featuring Beenie Man & Bounty Killer)
2018: "DANG DIGGI BANG"(당디기 방) (RPR (duo) featuring Beenie Man)

Guest appearances

Notes

References

External links
 Official website
 Beenie Man at AllMusic
 
 

Discographies of Jamaican artists